Keota may refer to:

Towns in the United States
Keota, Colorado
Keota, Iowa
Keota, Missouri
Keota, Oklahoma

Towns in Bangladesh
Keota, Bangladesh

Towns in India
Keota, Hooghly